Wayne Jacobs (born 3 February 1969) is an English football coach and former professional player who is an assistant manager at Sheffield Wednesday under Darren Moore.

Playing career
During his career he played for Sheffield Wednesday, Hull City, Rotherham United, Bradford City and Halifax Town.

Coaching career
On 29 June 2007, it was announced that Jacobs would be returning to Bradford as assistant manager under Stuart McCall, and on 8 February 2010 he took over as manager in a temporary capacity when McCall departed. He was assistant manager under former England under 21 manager Peter Taylor but was put on gardening leave in February 2011, following Taylor's departure. Following the appointment of Darren Moore as caretaker Head Coach at West Bromwich Albion, Jacobs was given a position on the club's coaching staff in an unofficial and part-time capacity. However subsequent to Moore being given the job full-time, Jacobs was appointed second assistant head coach on 5 September 2018, serving alongside first assistant head coach Graeme Jones and head coach Darren Moore. On 9 March 2019, Moore was sacked as manager and Jacobs left together with him.
On 4 March, Darren Moore confirmed that Jacobs had joined Sheffield Wednesday as an assistant manager to work alongside Jamie Smith.

Outside of football
Wayne Jacobs founded the charity One In A Million which helps disadvantaged children in the city of Bradford. The One in a Million charity has also opened a free school in the city, in September 2013.

He is a Christian.

References

External links

Living people
1969 births
Association football fullbacks
Footballers from Sheffield
English footballers
Sheffield Wednesday F.C. players
Hull City A.F.C. players
Rotherham United F.C. players
Halifax Town A.F.C. players
Bradford City A.F.C. players
English Football League players
Premier League players
Bradford City A.F.C. managers
Bradford City A.F.C. non-playing staff
West Bromwich Albion F.C. non-playing staff
English football managers
English Christians
Sheffield Wednesday F.C. non-playing staff